Chhabildas Mehta (4 November 1925 – 29 November 2008) was an Indian politician and the former Chief Minister of Gujarat who served from 1994 to 1995.

Early life
Mehta was in born in Mahuva, a port town in Gujarat. He left high school in 1942 and participated in Indian independence movement.

Career
He became the president of the Mahuva Municipality. Later he was elected as a member of the Bombay Legislative Council. He participated in Mahagujarat Movement which demanded separate Gujarat state from Bombay state. He was elected to the Gujarat Legislative Assembly in 1962 from Mahuva constituency which he held till 1980.

He entered in the politics by joining the Praja Samajwadi Party. Later he joined Indian National Congress (INC). He was in the cabinet of Chimanbhai Patel as Finance Minister and he had been made Chief Minister of Gujarat after the sudden death of Chimanbhai Patel in 1994. He had joined the Janata Party followed by Janata Dal. Later he rejoined the INC. In May 2001, he resigned from the INC to join the Nationalist Congress Party and contested election but lost. He died on 29 November 2008 in Ahmedabad.

References 

1925 births
2008 deaths
Chief Ministers of Gujarat
Gujarat MLAs 1990–1995
Chief ministers from Indian National Congress
Politicians from Ahmedabad
Indian National Congress politicians from Gujarat
Janata Party politicians
Janata Dal politicians
Nationalist Congress Party politicians from Gujarat